Striving For Togetherness Records (aka SFT Records) is an independent hardcore music label known for its mid-1990s New York hardcore releases.

Notable releases
 Intent to Injure - "Habit of Thought" 7-inch
 Headfirst - "Intervention" 7-inch
 V/A - "X Marks the Spot" 7-inch (straight edge compilation)
 Without a Cause - "Nation of Neglect" 7-inch
 Stick Figure - "Meat & Potatoes" 7-inch
 Up Front - "Changes" 7-inch
 Choose X - "Our Struggle" 7-inch
 25 ta Life - s/t 7-inch (later re-released as a CD EP)
 District 9 - "Schoolahardknox" 7-inch
 Vision of Disorder - "Still" 7-inch
 No Redeeming Social Value/Six and Violence - split 7-inch
 No Redeeming Social Value - "Rocks the Party" CD
 No Redeeming Social Value - "Three Way Dance" (1988)
 V/A - N.Y.H.C. Documentary Soundtrack CD
 Fahrenheit 451 - "The Thought of It" CD
 Shutdown - Turning the Tide" CD EP
 No Redeeming Social Value - "Hardcore Your Lousy Ass Off" CD
 Six and Violence - "Petty Staycheck" CD
 Neck - s/t CD
 V/A - "Three Way Dance" CD (feat. Six and Violence, No Redeeming Social Value and Romantic Gorilla)
 No Redeeming Social Value - "THC" CD

References 

Hardcore record labels
American independent record labels